Carex praecox, the spring sedge, is a species of flowering plant in the genus Carex, native to Europe, western Asia, and Mongolia. Its diploid chromosome number is 2n=58, with some uncertainty.

References

praecox
Plants described in 1771